Colonie Central High School is a public high school in the town of Colonie, with the postal address of Albany, New York. In 2005 it had 2225 students and 132 classroom teachers. It is part of the South Colonie Central School District. The building principal was Christopher Robilotti until the 2020-2021 school year when Thomas Kachadurian was promoted.

Academics
Colonie High School offers Advanced Placement (AP) courses in numerous disciplines. In addition, the high school, in conjunction with nearby Hudson Valley Community College, offers several "College in High School courses", in which students can earn college credits for classes taken in the high school. Colonie also has a large technology department, where students can take all of the courses in the Project Lead the Way engineering sequence. Also, the school offers credits from SUNY Albany, RIT and College of St. Rose. Three foreign languages are taught at the school, including Spanish, French and Italian.

Notable alumni

Notable alumni include:
 Tony Rossi (b. 1943), college baseball coach
 Michael Nolin (b. 1948), film producer, writer, director, executive, Savannah college of Art and Design professor
 Jason Bittner (b. 1970), drummer, Shadows Fall
 Chad Dukes (b. 1971), running back for several NFL teams
 David Gamble (b. 1971), wide receiver for the Super Bowl Champion Denver Broncos
 Julia DeVillers, children's book author, book made into Disney Channel movie Read it and Weep
 Bobby Fish, (b. 1976), professional wrestler for All Elite Wrestling.
 Lucy D’Escoffier Crespo da Silva (b. 1978), MIT student and promising astronomer for whom the asteroid 96747 Crespodasilva is named. She died in 2000.
 Kristie Marano (b. 1979), Olympic wrestler

References

External links
 Colonie Central High School
 publicschoolreview.com

Colonie, New York
Public high schools in Albany County, New York